Katyayani Sharma (also known as Renu Sharma) is an Indian actress and model from Punjab. She started her career at a very early age, as a character of a rich girl 'Natasha' in Karam Apna Apna on Star Plus. She also starred as a lead actress in Sajan Ghar Jaana Hai on Star Plus. After then got a chance for Sathiya as a lead character, but she had to refuse that show, for a Tamil movie Parvathipuram in 2010.

Career 

She made her foray on the Tollywood in 2011 as a lead actress with  Bhanu Chander's son, Jayanth and Sri Hari's Shiv Keshwa(2013).
. She appeared in three serials in Hindi. She has also appeared in numerous print and TV ads, like Abhiyan SOS, Mathoot Finance, ICICI, Horlicks. Katyayani Sharma  started her career in Indian soap opera's in 2010 with Karam Apna Apna, Sajan Ghar Jaana Hai and Sathiya  on Star Plus before moving on to Tamil Movies with Parvathipuram.

Television 
Karam Apna Apna
Sajan Ghar Jaana Hai
Sathiya

Filmography

References
http://epaper.prabhatkhabar.com/m/1206472/RANCHI-City/City#issue/28/1
By : www.facebook.com/sanjeetnmishra

Living people
Indian film actresses
21st-century Indian actresses
Actresses from Punjab, India
1989 births